Angolan Union for Peace, Democracy and Development (UADPP) is a political party in Angola. The party was founded on February 16, 1994. The party is a member of the coalition New Democracy.

References

Political parties in Angola
Political parties established in 1994
1994 establishments in Angola